High Peak Radio was a commercial radio station broadcasting to the Peak District, Derbyshire, from studios in Chapel-en-le-Frith. It broadcast on 106.4 (Buxton & Glossop), 103.3 (Buxworth & Hope Valley), and 106.6 FM (Chapel-en-le-Frith).

Its sister station, Ashbourne Radio, broadcast from Ashbourne on 96.7 FM (Ashbourne) and 101.8 FM (Wirksworth & Uttoxeter). On 4 November 2019, both stations relaunched as Imagine Radio, sharing off-peak programming with its sister station in Stockport.

In June 2021, Bauer Media announced that they were buying the Imagine Radio stations from the Like Media Group, which would be merged into the Greatest Hits Radio network on 1 September 2021.

Several former High Peak Radio presenters joined a competing online station called Peak Sound Radio, formed after the closure of the Imagine stations.

References

External links
 High Peak Radio
 Ashbourne Radio

High
Radio stations established in 2004
Greatest Hits Radio
Bauer Radio